The Dyakovo culture is an Iron Age culture which occupied a significant part of the Upper Volga, Valday and Oka River area.

The Dyakovo archaeological sites became the subject of interest in the early 19th century. 

The earliest phase of the culture was a colonization in the late 9th - early 8th century BC. These were small settlements situated on riverbanks close to water, like Tchyortov gorodok (Чёртов городок) on the Moscow River. The Kuntsevskoye, Troitskoye, Scherbinskoye and other sites are located in the territory of modern Moscow. These sites were fortified with moats and ramparts added frequently, with wooden structures, and show clear traces of dwellings. 

The 6-7th centuries was a time of crisis for the Dyakovo culture, for reasons still unknown.

The Dyakovo culture was probably formed by Finnic peoples, such as the ancestors of the Merya, Muromian, Meshchera, and Veps tribes. All regional toponyms and hydronyms stem from Finno-Ugric languages, for example Yauza River which is a confluent of the Moskva River, and probably the Moskva River itself.

References 

Archaeological cultures of Eastern Europe
Iron Age cultures of Europe
Archaeological cultures in Russia
Finno-Ugric archaeological cultures
History of Ivanovo Oblast
History of Kostroma Oblast
History of Moscow Oblast
History of Moscow
History of Smolensk Oblast
History of Tver Oblast
History of Vologda Oblast
History of Yaroslavl Oblast